The Empty Box and Zeroth Maria, known in Japan as  and colloquially referred to as , is a Japanese light novel series written by Eiji Mikage, with illustrations by Tetsuo. ASCII Media Works published seven novels from January 2009 to June 2015 under their Dengeki Bunko imprint. The novels have been licensed for release in North America by Yen Press.

Plot
The story revolves around a carefree boy named Kazuki Hoshino, who is intensely attached to his normal daily life, and Aya Otonashi, who suddenly transfers into his class for the 13,118th time and declares her goal to "break" him forthwith. This starts an avalanche of events, involving a supernatural device known as the Boxes and a supernatural being, which pits the two characters against each other causing their friends to be caught under their crossfire.

Characters

Main characters

Kazuki is the protagonist of the Hakomari series. He is a completely ordinary high school student who loves idle chatter with his friends and Umaibōs, a Japanese snack. The story begins when Kazuki is offered a box by O. Kazuki however refuses the box because the only thing that he wishes for is a normal everyday life. Because of Kazuki's disinterest in the box and his will for an everyday life, O becomes interested in Kazuki. O gives boxes to several people around Kazuki, and before Kazuki knows it his everyday is being destroyed in several different ways. O makes it his mission to study Kazuki in these different scenarios until he believes Kazuki will give in and use a box himself. One day, he is suddenly antagonized by Aya Otonashi — although he has never met her before. She threatens to "break" him.

Maria is a beautiful but unsociable girl with a resolute personality. She transferred into Kazuki's class on March 2nd — almost at the end of the school year. Maria is very stern in her actions and beliefs. She expressed her wish to "break" Hoshino at the very beginning. There is one however one thing that Maria is terrified of, and that is killing someone else. No matter the circumstance, Maria refuses to kill anyone even if it meant saving Kazuki's life. Maria cares deeply for other people because of her wish to become a box herself and is willing to sacrifice her own memories in order to give other people a place where they can be happy inside her box.

Supporting characters

'O' (not to be confused with the numeral 0, "zero") is the main antagonist of the series and the giver of the wish-granting boxes. Throughout the series, 'O' demonstrates a fascination with Kazuki Hoshino (who rejected her offer of a box before the events of the story) that motivates her to alter and observe Kazuki's life by giving boxes to the people around him. A supernatural entity whose appearance constantly changes, 'O' describes herself as a "vector", a form and purpose that was given to a much larger, transcendent but ultimately purposeless being with the ability to grant wishes. Daiya Oomine later realizes that 'O' was created as a result of Maria Otonashi's initial wish that became The Flawed Bliss, with Kazuki Hoshino serving as 'O's counterpart, The Empty Box. At the start of the series, 'O' considers Kazuki to be very dear, but after coming to the realization of her origins, 'O' takes on the appearance of Maria's deceased older sister and declares Kazuki to be her enemy. Calculating and emotionless, 'O's one ultimate motivation seems to be the observation of interesting humans and the "screeching of their hearts".

Kokone is a bright and beautiful girl who cares a lot for her friends, but is meddlesome at times. She and Daiya have known each other since childhood, and their mutual verbal abuse has become legendary among their classmates ever since. Kokone is a very outgoing person. She likes to tease Kazuki, Haruaki and Daiya, who often tease her back.

A self-centered and arrogant student who dyes his hair silver and wears three piercings in his right ear. He is the class president of the second year students and a shrewd friend of Kazuki's.

Kasumi is the girl who has won Kazuki's heart. She is docile, silent and expressionless. Kasumi lived a normal life going to school, however she was always depressed. Since she never showed any emotions herself, always forcing a smile onto her face, and was never happy, she thought everyone else must be faking it too. She thought nobody would ever notice her, until one day Kazuki ran towards her after she left school asking if she was okay, because she seemed bothered. Mogi denied having anything bothering her, but at the same time she fell in love with Kazuki as he noticed that her smile was fake.

Haruaki is a cheerful but frivolous baseball ace. He often hangs out with Kazuki and Daiya.

Other

The class president of Kazuki's class. Considered by many to be a reliable and an exemplary student.

 One of Maria Otomashi's numerous fans that have emerged after the entrance ceremony. She's stubborn but cheerful.

She is the student council president. She is very intelligent and very athletic, which enables her to attain almost anything she desires. She is close friends with Yuuri Yanagi and first appears at a similar time within the story.

An orderly and timorous girl who appears during the "Game of Idleness". She is a very close friend of the student council president Iroha Shindou. 

A first year student who appears during the "Game of Idleness". He attended the same middle school as Kokone, Daiya, and Haruaki.

Kazuki's older sister who has a carefree personality.

 Kazuki's first love and the girlfriend of his best friend, Touji. A troublemaker at heart, but also incredibly frail and insecure. Mysteriously vanished one day.

 Kazuki's best friends during middle school, and the boyfriend of Nana Yanagi. Mysteriously vanished one day.

A girl who attended the same middle school as Koudai, Kokone, Daiya, and Haruaki.

Media

Light novels

Music
The Empty Box and Zeroth Maria has two main theme songs: the opening theme  and the ending theme . Both songs were written by Eiji Mikage, sung by En and composed by Kei Fujimiya. They were released on April 26, 2015, by Replicaletter.

Reception

Notes and references
Notes

References

Attribution

External links
 Release information at Dengeki Bunko 

2009 Japanese novels
Dengeki Bunko
Light novels
Yen Press titles